Tsongas is a surname. Notable people with the surname include:

 Niki Tsongas (born 1946), American politician, wife of Paul
 Paul Tsongas (1941–1997), American politician
 Tsongas Center

See also
 Tsonga (disambiguation)
 Tsonga language